Lillian Elliott (24 April 1874 – 15 January 1959) was a stage and film actress, appearing in 60 films between 1915 and 1943. She was born in Canada and died in Hollywood, California. She was married to actor James Corrigan, and their eldest son, Lloyd Corrigan, became a Hollywood writer, director, and character actor.

Partial filmography

 Help Wanted (1915) - Mrs. Meyers
 Lavender and Old Lace (1921) - Jane Hathaway
 Too Much Married (1921) - Mrs. Peter Gulp
 The Chorus Lady (1924) - Mrs. Patrick O'Brien
 One Glorious Night (1924) - Mrs. Clark
 Proud Flesh (1925) - Mrs. Casey
 Old Clothes (1925) - Nathan's Mother
 Sally, Irene and Mary (1938) - Mrs. O'Dare
 Partners Again (1926) - Rosie Potash
 The Volga Boatman (1926) - Landlady (uncredited)
 The Family Upstairs (1926) - Emma Heller
 The City (1926) - Mrs. Elliott
 Ankles Preferred (1927) - Mrs. Goldberg
 The King of Kings (1927) - (uncredited)
 Call of the Cuckoo (1927, Short) - Mama Gimplewart
 The Swellhead (1930) - Mrs. Callahan
 Song o' My Heart (1930) - Irish Woman (uncredited)
 Liliom (1930) - Aunt Hulda
 Her Wedding Night (1930) - Mrs. Marshall
 The Single Sin (1931) - Cook
 The Spy (1931) - Minor Role
 Broken Lullaby (1932) - Frau Bresslauer (uncredited)
 Free Eats (1932, Short) - Mrs. Stanford L. Clark
 Polly of the Circus (1932) - Mrs. McNamara
 Sinners in the Sun (1932) - Jimmie's Landlady (uncredited)
 Evenings for Sale (1932) - Frau Meyer (uncredited)
 A Bedtime Story (1933) - Aristide's Wife
 The Trumpet Blows (1934) - Senora Ramirez
 One More River (1934) - Flower Woman (uncredited)
 Mrs. Wiggs of the Cabbage Patch (1934) - Mrs. Bagby
 A Wicked Woman (1934) - Mrs. Johnson (uncredited)
 Helldorado (1935) - Elsie's Mother (uncredited)
 The Casino Murder Case (1935) - Mrs. Marting (uncredited)
 Alias Mary Dow (1935) - Orphan Matron (uncredited)
 Just My Luck (1935) - Mrs. Riley - Landlady
 Green Light (1937) - Mrs. Crandall - Harcourt's Housekeeper (uncredited)
 Jim Hanvey, Detective (1937) - Society Woman (uncredited)
 The Jury's Secret (1938) - Mrs. Muller (uncredited)
 The Chaser (1938) - Prison Matron (uncredited)
 Wanted by the Police (1938) - Mrs. Murphy
 Service de Luxe (1938) - Small Towner (uncredited)
 Tough Kid (1938) - Katie Murphy
 Society Lawyer (1939) - Durant's Cook (uncredited)
 Boys' Reformatory (1939) - Mrs. O'Meara
 When Tomorrow Comes (1939) - Character Woman (uncredited)
 Irish Luck (1939) - Mrs. O'Brien
 Heroes in Blue (1939) - Mrs. Murphy
 Emergency Squad (1940) - Landlady (uncredited)
 Chasing Trouble (1940) - Mrs. O'Brien
 Women Without Names (1940) - Mrs. Anthony (uncredited)
 On the Spot (1940) - Mrs. Kelly
 Laughing at Danger (1940) - Mrs. Kelly
 Road to Happiness (1941) - Mrs. Price
 Gangway for Tomorrow (1943) - Burke's Mother (uncredited)

References

External links

1874 births
1959 deaths
Canadian film actresses
Canadian silent film actresses
Burials at Hollywood Forever Cemetery
20th-century Canadian actresses
Canadian expatriate actresses in the United States